150th Brigade may refer to:

 150th Indian Infantry Brigade
 Panzer Brigade 150 (Germany)
 CL International Brigade (Spain)
 150th (York and Durham) Brigade (United Kingdom)
 150th Infantry Brigade (United Kingdom)

See also

 150th Division (disambiguation)
 150th Regiment (disambiguation)